Joseph T. Niehaus, Sr. (February 23, 1906 – August 8, 1989) was an American farmer, businessman, and politician.

Niehaus was born on a farm near Melrose, Minnesota and went to high school. Niehaus took agricultural courses in vocational school and went to University of Minnesota. He was a farmer and lived in Sauk Centre, Minnesota with his wife and family. Niehaus was also involved with the rural telephone company and the Sauk Centre Creamery. He was also a beekeeper and produced honey. Niehaus served in the Minnesota House of Representatives from 1969 to 1982 and was a Republican. Niehaus died at St. Michael's Hospital in Sauk Centre, Minnesota.

References

1906 births
1989 deaths
People from Melrose, Minnesota
People from Sauk Centre, Minnesota
American beekeepers
Farmers from Minnesota
Businesspeople from Minnesota
Republican Party members of the Minnesota House of Representatives
University of Minnesota alumni